The St. Stephen's Cathedral of Shkodër in Rozafa, also known as the Fatih Sultan Mehmet Mosque, is a 13th-century building within the Rozafa Castle near Shkodër, Albania.

History
The cathedral was build in the castle of Rozafa in the 13th century, and enlarged in the 14th and 15th centuries while being under Venice possession. In 1319 Don Andrea of Shkodër brought from Ragusa carpenters to assist in the renovation of the area of the church dedicated to the choir. Another renovation is mentioned in 1403 from the then captain general of Shkodër, who brought from Ragusa 5000 tiles to use for coverage of the church's roof.

The construction typology is similar to that used in the Ratac Abbey, in today Montenegro, which was later built, as well as with a church of Šas. It had a cella, covered by roof, as well as an altar distinguished by crossed vaults. The altar had the only window of the church. There are elements of both dominican and franciscan type of construction in the cathedral. 

Close to the church must have existed the house of the bishop, which is documented since 1251, however, after the 1478-1479 Siege of Shkodra the bishop was no longer allowed to reside in the castle. The Ottomans transformed the church into a mosque in 1685. After that year from the former church's objects the old organon was kept, as a war trophy, within the mosque. When the cathedral became a mosque in 1685, it bore the name of Mehmet the Conqueror Mosque. A minaret was built on the southern side of the former cathedral and, within a niche of the altar, was built a mihrab.

Nearby the church, until 1951, has existed an inn, called The Inn of Noka, which seems to have been built on the foundations of the bishop's house.

In 1939 Italian priest and albanologist Zef Valentini suggested ways to perform restoration work on the church. A planned attempt to convert the mosque into its origin, a church with partial U.S. sponsorship was not liked by the Muslim community of Shkodër, and the ambassador of the United States, Ms. Marcy Ries, promised to re-assess the funding of the project.

The ruins of this church-mosque feature a Dikka, a Mihrab, and the remains of a large Minaret.  The Fatih Sultan Mehmet mosque is one of the few buildings from the Middle Ages in Shkodër and is the only mosque that partially survived in Shkodra during the dictatorship of Enver Hoxha, who destroyed all 36 mosques in Shkodër.

See also
 Islam in Albania

References

Sources
 
 
 
 

Mosque
Mosques in Shkodër
Churches completed in the 1250s
Religious buildings and structures converted into mosques
Mosques converted from churches in the Ottoman Empire
Tourist attractions in Shkodër County
Roman Catholic churches in Albania
Gothic architecture in Albania